Lake Kereta lies at the South Head peninsula of the Kaipara Harbour, in the Rodney District, along the west coast of the North Island of New Zealand.

It is primarily filled by underground water, and losses are due to evaporation from the surface of the lake.

See also
List of lakes of New Zealand

References

Kereta
Rodney Local Board Area